Daniel Martin Wilson,  (1862 – 5 January 1932) was an Irish politician and judge.

He was born in Limerick, the son of Rev. David Wilson, and was educated at the Royal Belfast Academical Institution and at Trinity College Dublin. He was married in Belfast in 1894 to Eleanor Black, herself the daughter of a Presbyterian minister. 

He was appointed a Bencher of King's Inns in 1911. He served as a 2nd lieutenant with the Royal Inniskilling Fusiliers from 1914, was promoted to captain in 1915, and resigned from ill health in 1916.

He was Unionist Member of Parliament for West Down from December 1918 to 1921 and served in government as Solicitor General for Ireland from 1919 to 1921. He stood down on appointment as Recorder of Belfast and as Land Judge of the Supreme Court of Northern Ireland in 1921.

Sources
 Who Was Who

External links 
 
 

Solicitors-General for Ireland
1862 births
1932 deaths
People from Limerick (city)
People educated at the Royal Belfast Academical Institution
Irish barristers
Alumni of Trinity College Dublin
British Army personnel of World War I
Royal Inniskilling Fusiliers officers
Members of the Parliament of the United Kingdom for County Down constituencies (1801–1922)
UK MPs 1918–1922
High Court judges of Northern Ireland
Recorders of Belfast
Irish Unionist Party MPs
Politicians from Limerick (city)